The Obel River (or Ubel River) is a right tributary of the Mareb (Gash) river. The latter watercourse forms part of the border between Eritrea and Ethiopia, with its headwaters in the Eritrean Highlands.

According Ministry of Information of Eritrea, around Obel River's banks there are big farms where fruits and vegetables are grown.

See also
List of rivers of Eritrea

References

Rivers of Eritrea
Rivers of Ethiopia
International rivers of Africa
Eritrea–Ethiopia border
Border rivers